SZNZ: Winter is the tenth EP by American rock band Weezer, and the last of four EPs in their SZNZ (pronounced "seasons") project. It was released digitally on December 21, 2022, coinciding with the December solstice. It spawned a single, "I Want a Dog", released on December 9, 2022.

Background 
Rivers Cuomo described the project's overall emotion as sadness. Cuomo said that the songwriting would be stylistically similar to Elliott Smith featuring "lots of loss and despair".

Weezer, under their Goat Punishment pseudonym, performed SZNZ: Winter in its entirety at The Troubadour in West Hollywood, California on September 19, 2022.

Release 
The lead single, "I Want a Dog", was released on December 9, 2022, with a live performance of the song on Jimmy Kimmel Live! on December 16, 2022.

SZNZ: Winter officially released on December 21, 2022 alongside a video for "Dark Enough to See the Stars".

Critical reception

Anne Erikson at Blabbermouth.net opined that the album "proves" that Weezer "can still churn out music that's as strong as their mid-1990s debut."  However, Michelle Dalarossa from Under the Radar was more critical of the album, stating "Unfortunately, the combination of Christmas kitsch and Weezer kitsch makes for a grating mishmash of tackiness, angst, and blown-out fuzz that ultimately falls flat." Nonetheless, Dalarossa notes instances of "knack for ear worm vocal melodies and exhilarating power-pop guitar riffs glimmer."

Track listing

Personnel

Weezer
 Rivers Cuomo – lead vocals, backing vocals, guitars, production
 Brian Bell – guitars, backing vocals
 Patrick Wilson – drums
 Scott Shriner – bass guitar, backing vocals

Additional musicians
 Max Bernstein – music direction
 Jonathan Dreyfus – banjo, cello, double bass, harmonium, harpsichord, Mellotron, orchestral arrangement, theremin, viola, violin
 Amy Andersen – backing vocals
 Jean-Louise Parker – backing vocals, viola, violin
 Harry Cooper – clarinet
 Jonathan Leahy – string arrangement
 Kelly O'Donohue – trumpet
 Jake Sinclair – additional vocals, synthesizer (track 1)
 Efe Cakar – additional guitar (2)
 Suzy Shinn – additional vocals (3)

Technical
 James Flannigan – production
 Suzy Shinn – production
 Emily Lazar – mastering
 Chris Dugan – mixing
 Jonathan Dreyfus – engineering, recording
 Ivan Wayman – engineering
 Jason Hiller – engineering
 Kevin Smith – engineering
 Jean-Louise Parker – recording
 Alex Parker – engineering assistance
 Alissa Laymac – engineering assistance
 Bella Corich – engineering assistance
 Peter Hanaman – engineering assistance
 Tori Newberry – engineering assistance
 Mike Fasano – drum technician
 Patrick Lehman – guitar technician

Charts

References

2022 EPs
Atlantic Records EPs
Weezer EPs